The Pilbara dtella (Gehyra pilbara) is a species of gecko endemic to Australia.

References

Gehyra
Reptiles described in 1965
Geckos of Australia
Taxa named by Francis John Mitchell